Samburu North is a constituency in Kenya. It is one of three constituencies in Samburu County.

References 

Constituencies in Samburu County